Olga Alekseyevna Vasilyeva (born July 3, 1972 is a Russian film and stage actress.

One of her most famous acting roles is that of Grand Duchess Maria in Gleb Panfilov's The Romanovs: An Imperial Family (2000).

Filmography
 Edelweißpiraten  (2004)
 Klyuch ot spalni  (2003)
 Romanovy: Ventsenosnaya semya (2000)
 Barkhanov i ego telokhranitel (1996)
 Zolotoye dno (1995)
 Limita  (1994)
 Poslednyaya subbota  (1993)
 Ty u menya odna  (1993)
 Muzhskoy zigzag (1992)

External links

Russian actresses
1972 births
Living people
Herzen University alumni